Lircay is a town in Central Peru, capital of the province Angaraes in the region Huancavelica. It is located at an altitude of 3,278 m.
The town had a population according to the 2007 census of 6,563 people. Most of the people of the town belong to the native American race.

Transportation
The city is connected to the city of Huancavelica by a 2-lane road that was paved in 2016.

Education 
The town is home of a local university; the Universidad para el Desarrollo Andino, and has a branch of the Universidad Nacional de Huancavelica. There are a local technical institute; the Instituto Tecnologico Lircay.

Health 
Lircay has a clinic, Centro de Salud, that serves the city and the towns nearby.

References

Populated places in the Huancavelica Region